Maike Nollen (born 15 November 1977, in East Berlin, East Germany) is a German sprint canoer who competed in the early to mid-2000s. She won a gold medal in the K-4 500 m event at the 2004 Summer Olympics in Athens.

Nollen also won three medals at the ICF Canoe Sprint World Championships with two silvers (K-2 1000 m: 2002, K-4 500 m: 2002) and a bronze (K-4 200 m: 2002).

References

1977 births
Canoeists at the 2004 Summer Olympics
German female canoeists
Living people
Olympic canoeists of Germany
Olympic gold medalists for Germany
Canoeists from Berlin
Olympic medalists in canoeing
ICF Canoe Sprint World Championships medalists in kayak
Medalists at the 2004 Summer Olympics